Bishop Daniel Alphonse Omer Verstraete, O.M.I. (born 31 July 1924) is a Belgian-born South African Catholic prelate who served as the first Diocesan Bishop of the new promoted Roman Catholic Diocese of Klerksdorp from 27 February 1978 until his resignation on 26 March 1994. Previously he was a Prefect Apostolic of the Prefecture Apostolic of Western Transvaal from 9 November 1965 until 27 February 1978 and a participant of the Second Vatican Council.

Biography
Verstraete was born in the Flemish Region of Belgium and as a young person joined a missionary congregation of the Missionary Oblates of Mary Immaculate, where he made a solemn profession and was ordained a priest on February 19, 1950, after completed his philosophical and theological education.

Verstraete worked as a missionary in South Africa and was appointed the first Prefect Apostolic of the new created Prefecture Apostolic of Western Transvaal on November 9, 1965. In this time he participated in the Fourth session of the Second Vatican Council as a Council Father in 1965.

On February 27, 1978 the Prefecture Apostolic was elevated in the rank of a Diocese and Mons. Verstraete was appointed as the first bishop of the Roman Catholic Diocese of Klerksdorp. He was consecrated to the Episcopate on May 14, 1978, in Klerksdorp. The principal consecrator was Archbishop Peter Fanyana John Butelezi, OMI with other prelates of the Roman Catholic Church.

In this office Verstraete served until his resignation on March 26, 1994.

References

External links
Catholic-Hierarchy

1924 births
Living people
People from Oostrozebeke
Flemish priests
Missionary Oblates of Mary Immaculate
Participants in the Second Vatican Council
20th-century Roman Catholic bishops in South Africa
Roman Catholic bishops of Klerksdorp
Belgian expatriates in South Africa
Belgian Roman Catholic bishops